Orly – Sud is an Orlyval station in front of the South Terminal of Orly Airport. It consists of two half stations on a viaduct that runs along the northern facade of the terminal. The access is through Gate K in the baggage claim area.

Lines serving this station
 Orlyval

Adjacent stations
 Orly - Ouest

See also
 List of stations of the Paris RER
 List of stations of the Paris Métro

Sud, Orly - Sud (Orlyval)
Réseau Express Régional stations
Railway stations in France opened in 1991